Marco Cusin (born 28 February 1985) is an Italian professional basketball player for Pallacanestro Cantù of the Italian Serie A2 second tier national league.

Professional career
On 14 July 2010 Cusin signed a deal with the Italian club VL Pesaro.

On 4 July 2012 Marco Cusin signed a deal with Pallacanestro Cantù.

In September 2014, Cusin went to Banco di Sardegna Sassari, but after just 35 days, on 28 October, he came back to Vanoli Cremona where he has played in the past.

On 29 June 2016 Cusin signed with Sidigas Avellino.

On 28 July 2017 Cusin signed a deal with Olimpia Milano for both LBA and EuroLeague, where he played for the first time in his career.

On 2 July 2018 Cusin left Milano and signed with Auxilium Torino.

On 25 August 2019 he signed with JuveCaserta of the Italian Serie A2 Basket. 

On 30 October 2020 he joined Fortitudo Bologna, coached by Romeo Sacchetti, in the Italian Lega Basket Serie A and the FIBA Basketball Champions League (BCL).

On 30 September 2021 he signed for Pallacanestro Cantù of the Italian Serie A2 second tier national league.

National team career
He was called up to the squad that would take part in EuroBasket 2015 to start on 5 September.

References

External links
Eurobasket.com Profile
Basketball-Reference.com Stats

1985 births
Living people
Auxilium Pallacanestro Torino players
Centers (basketball)
Dinamo Sassari players
Fabriano Basket players
Fortitudo Pallacanestro Bologna players
Italian men's basketball players
Juvecaserta Basket players
Lega Basket Serie A players
Olimpia Milano players
Pallacanestro Biella players
Pallacanestro Cantù players
Pallacanestro Trieste players
People from Pordenone
S.S. Felice Scandone players
Sportspeople from Friuli-Venezia Giulia
Vanoli Cremona players
Victoria Libertas Pallacanestro players